Albert "Al" Beckles (born July 14, 1930, as stated by Albert himself on John Hansen’s Bodybuilding Legends podcast) is a former IFBB pro bodybuilder and Mr. Universe. He is a three-time New York City ‘Night of Champions’ winner. He is celebrated for being competitive at the top level in his fifties.

Bodybuilding career 
Beckles was born in Barbados but immigrated to London.  In the mid-1960s, he won several British regional titles before winning the 1969 and 1970 NABBA Mr. Britain titles.
In 1971, Beckles joined the IFBB, earning the overall at the IFBB "Mr. Universe."

Beckles was one of the most active participants in bodybuilding history, having been in over 100 contests.  In 1982, at the age of 52, he won the Night of Champions competition in New York.

Beckles’ 13 forays into the IFBB Mr. Olympia have yielded six placings among the top five, including coming second to Lee Haney in 1985 at the age of 55.

In 1991, at the age of 61 years, he won the Niagara Falls Pro Invitational.

Personal life 
Beckles currently resides in Los Angeles.

Beckles is a "pollo-vegetarian", which means he eats poultry but no red meat.

Statistics 
Height: 5'7

Weight: 218 lb

Neck: 18

Waist: 31

Thigh: 28

Calf: 16¾

Arms: 21

Chest: 50

Contest history

References

External links
 Albert Beckles Gallery
 Albert Beckles Photos

1930 births
Living people
Barbadian emigrants to England
Barbadian sportspeople
Black British sportspeople
British bodybuilders
British emigrants to the United States
British expatriate sportspeople in the United States
People associated with physical culture
Professional bodybuilders